Toussaintia is a genus of flowering plants in the family Annonaceae. There are four species. All are native to Africa.

Species include:
Toussaintia congolensis
Toussaintia hallei
Toussaintia orientalis
Toussaintia patriciae

References

Annonaceae
Annonaceae genera
Taxonomy articles created by Polbot